Zariaspes is a Neotropical genus of grass skipper butterflies in the family Hesperiidae.

Species
The following species are recognised in the genus Mnestheus:
Zariaspes aurora Bell, 1942
Zariaspes mys (Hübner, [1808]) mys skipper – east Mexico to south Brazil and Paraguay 
Zariaspes mythecus Godman, 1900 Godman's skipper – west Mexico
 BOLD:ADA7943 (Zariaspes sp.)

References

Natural History Museum Lepidoptera genus database

Hesperiinae
Hesperiidae of South America
Hesperiidae genera
Taxa named by Frederick DuCane Godman